Niskonlith Lake Provincial Park is a provincial park in British Columbia, Canada, located southwest of the town of Chase.

References

Provincial parks of British Columbia
Thompson Country
1975 establishments in British Columbia
Protected areas established in 1975